Karhusaari (Finnish), Björnsö (Swedish) is a subdistrict of Helsinki, Finland.

Neighbourhoods of Helsinki